NSS-806 (New Skies Satellite 806), before Intelsat 806, is a communications satellite originally operated by Intelsat. Launched in 1998 it was operated in geostationary orbit at a longitude of 47 degrees west for around 15 years. It is currently located in the orbital position of 47.5 degrees west longitude, was initially operated by Intelsat, orbited at 40.5 degrees west, and was purchased by SES World Skies (a subsidiary of SES).

Satellite 
NSS-806 is equipped with 28 transponders in C band and 3 in Ku band, making transmissions for the Americas and parts of Europe. In order to receive the signal it requires a monofocal antenna (LNBF antenna in the center), a LNBF for C band (5150 MHz) and a digital receiver compatible with C band. The NSS-806 emits its signal in circular polarization.

Launch 
The launch of NSS-806 made use of an Atlas II rocket flying from Cape Canaveral Air Force Station, Florida, United States. The launch took place at 00:16 UTC on February 28, 1998, with the spacecraft entering a geosynchronous transfer orbit. NSS-806 subsequently fired its apogee motor to achieve geostationary orbit.

Health and replacement 
In July 2017, seven years past its 12-year intended design life, NSS-806 lost the use of 12 of its 39 transponders.  NSS-806's replacement, SES-14, was scheduled to be launched in first quarter of 2018 on a SpaceX Falcon 9, and SES predicted that the transponder failure would result in a revenue loss of between 7 and 9 million euros.  The following month, SES arranged to swap flights so that SES-12 would launch in January 2018 on an Ariane 5, with SES-12, originally scheduled for that flight, now launching on the Falcon 9 later in Q1.

SES-14 was launched from Kourou on 25 January 2018, but was placed in an incorrect orbit due to a launch vehicle anomaly.  SES reported that the all-electric SES-14 would take four more weeks than originally planned to reach its operating orbit, but that the satellite was healthy and was expected to meet its designed life time.  SES-14's in-service date, originally set for July 2018, was expected to be pushed back until at least August 2018.

Technical details

References

Intelsat satellites
SES satellites
Spacecraft launched in 1998
Communications satellites in geostationary orbit